The 2018 SangSom Six-red World Championship was a six-red snooker invitational tournament being held between 3 and 8 September 2018 at the Bangkok Convention Center in Bangkok, Thailand.

Mark Williams was the defending champion, but he lost in the last 16 to amateur player Mohammed Shehab.

The event was won by Kyren Wilson, defeating Ding Junhui 8–4 in the final.

Prize money
The breakdown of prize money is shown below:
 Winner: 3,500,000 baht
 Runner-up: 1,300,000 baht
 Semi-finalists: 750,000 baht
 Quarter-finalists: 375,000 baht
 Last 16: 150,000 baht
 Third in Group: 75,000 baht
 Fourth in Group: 50,000 baht
 Total: 10,000,000 baht

Round-robin stage
Group matches were played from 3–5 September. The top two players from each group qualified for the knock-out stage. All matches were the best of 9 frames.

Positions within the group were decided by the number of matches won (MW) and then, in the event of a tie, by the frame difference (FD). Where two players were still tied, the result of the match between them determined their positions. Where three players were still tied, the top position was determined by a draw and the other two positions by the result of the match between those two players.

Group A

 Mark Williams 5–1 Thepchaiya 
 Tom Ford 5–4 Ricky Walden
 Thepchaiya Un-Nooh 4–5 Ricky Walden
 Mark Williams 5–4 Tom Ford
 Mark Williams 5–2 Ricky Walden
 Thepchaiya Un-Nooh 1–5 Tom Ford

Group B

 Ryan Day 5–1 Nutcharut Wongharuthai
 Luo Honghao 2–5 Stephen Maguire
 Nutcharut Wongharuthai 1–5 Stephen Maguire
 Ryan Day 5–2 Luo Honghao
 Nutcharut Wongharuthai 1–5 Luo Honghao
 Ryan Day 3–5 Stephen Maguire

Group C

 Stuart Bingham 5–3 James Wattana
 Shachar Ruberg 0–5 Mark King
 James Wattana 5–3 Mark King
 Stuart Bingham 5–1 Shachar Ruberg
 Stuart Bingham 5–2 Mark King
 James Wattana 5–2 Shachar Ruberg

Group D

 Michael White 0–5 Graeme Dott
 Kyren Wilson 5–0 Marvin Lim Chun Kiat
 Kyren Wilson 5–4 Michael White
 Marvin Lim Chun Kiat 1–5 Graeme Dott 
 Kyren Wilson 5–1 Graeme Dott
 Michael White 0–5 Marvin Lim Chun Kiat

Group E

 Sunny Akani 5–4 Jimmy Robertson
 Ding Junhui 5–3 Mohamed Khairy
 Ding Junhui 5–4 Sunny Akani
 Mohamed Khairy 1–5 Jimmy Robertson
 Ding Junhui 5–3 Jimmy Robertson
 Sunny Akani 5–1 Mohamed Khairy

Group F

 Michael Holt 5–3 Joe Perry
 Anthony McGill 5–3 Zhou Yuelong
 Anthony McGill 5–4 Michael Holt
 Zhou Yuelong 5–4 Joe Perry
 Anthony McGill 3–5 Joe Perry
 Michael Holt 2–5 Zhou Yuelong

Group G

 Noppon Saengkham 5–4 Marco Fu
 Luca Brecel 5–2 Kurt Dunham
 Luca Brecel 4–5 Marco Fu
 Noppon Saengkham 5–2 Kurt Dunham
 Luca Brecel 5–1 Noppon Saengkham
 Kurt Dunham 3–5 Marco Fu

Group H

 Thanawat Tirapongpaiboon 3–5 David Gilbert
 Mark Selby 5–4 Mohammed Shehab
 Mark Selby 5–1 David Gilbert
 Thanawat Tirapongpaiboon 4–5 Mohammed Shehab
 Mark Selby 5–2 Thanawat Tirapongpaiboon
 Mohammed Shehab 5–4 David Gilbert

Source:

Knockout stage 
The last 16 matches and quarter-finals were played on 6 September, the semi-finals on 7 September and the final on 8 September.

Final

Maximum breaks
(Note: A maximum break in 6-red is 75)
 Stuart Bingham
 Ding Junhui

References

External links
 

2018
2018 in Thai sport
2018 in snooker
September 2018 sports events in Thailand